Paracyprichromis brieni is a species of cichlid endemic to Lake Tanganyika where it is only known to occur in the northernmost portion of the lake.  It can reach a length of  TL.  This species can also be found in the aquarium trade. The specific name honours the author, Max Poll's, friend and fellow zoologist Paul Brien (1928-1964) of the Université libre de Bruxelles.

References

External links 
 Photograph

Fish of the Democratic Republic of the Congo
brieni
Endemic fauna of the Democratic Republic of the Congo
Taxa named by Max Poll
Taxonomy articles created by Polbot
Fish described in 1981